Holcocerus didmanidzae is a moth in the family Cossidae. It is found in Georgia.

The length of the forewings is about 12 mm. The forewings are light with a row of brown spots at the costal margin. The hindwings are patternless.

References

Natural History Museum Lepidoptera generic names catalog

Cossinae
Moths described in 2006
Moths of Europe
Moths of Asia